Richard Bradley Hill (born June 30, 1962) is an American baseball coach, who is the current head baseball coach of the Hawaii Rainbow Warriors. He was the head coach of the San Diego Toreros from 1999 to 2021. Prior to San Diego, Hill was the head coach of the Cal Lutheran Kingsmen from 1988–1993 and the San Francisco Dons from 1994–1998.  He also managed the Chatham A's, a collegiate summer baseball team in the Cape Cod Baseball League from 1990 to 1993. Hill's career head coaching record is 850–570–3, as of the end of the 2013 season.

Prior to his coaching career, Hill played college baseball briefly at San Diego State before transferring to Cal Lutheran to finish his college career.  He played one season of professional baseball (1985) with the Class-A Savannah Cardinals.

Hill is married to Lori and has two children. He is the father of Trevor Bauer accuser Lindsey Hill.

Head coaching record
Below is a table of Hill's yearly records as an NAIA and NCAA head baseball coach.

See also
 List of current NCAA Division I baseball coaches
 List of college baseball coaches with 1,100 wins

References

1962 births
Living people
Cal Lutheran Kingsmen baseball coaches
Cal Lutheran Kingsmen baseball players
Cape Cod Baseball League coaches
Hawaii Rainbow Warriors baseball coaches
San Diego Toreros baseball coaches
San Francisco Dons baseball coaches
Savannah Cardinals players